The following is a list of flags used in both Samoa and American Samoa. for more information about the national flag and the territory flag, Please see The Flag of Samoa and The Flag of American Samoa

National Flag

Territory Flag

Historical Flags

See also 

 Flag of Samoa
 Coat of arms of Samoa

References 

Lists and galleries of flags
Flags